Abbabubba is a compilation album by Black Francis released on March 15, 2011, in the US. It includes B-sides, remixes and re-workings of songs released on earlier albums, as well as original material.

Track listing

Album notes
"Rabbits" and "Dead Man's Curve" originally appeared on the album NonStopErotik.
"The Seus" originally appeared on the album Svn Fngrs.
“Il Cuchaiao” and “The Water” were originally only available from Francis' website
"Get Away Oil" originally appeared on the Threshold Apprehension EP.

Notes

2011 compilation albums
Black Francis albums
B-side compilation albums